The Noordzee-class tugboats are used by the Royal Netherlands Navy to dock their larger ships at the Nieuwe Haven Naval Base.

History 
This would become the Noordzee-class.

As an avocation to their main purpose they are used for trips with guests around the harbour.

Ships in class

Namesakes 
All the ships are named after seas with current or former Dutch shores:
 HNLMS Noordzee's namesake is the North Sea.
 HNLMS Waddenzee's namesake is the Wadden Sea.
 HNLMS Zuiderzee's namesake is the Zuiderzee.

Citations 

Tugboats of the Royal Netherlands Navy